Poplar Springs is an unincorporated community in Catoosa County, in the U.S. state of Georgia.

Etymology
This community took its name from Poplar Spring.

References

Unincorporated communities in Catoosa County, Georgia
Unincorporated communities in Georgia (U.S. state)